Captain Humbert Roque "Rocky" Versace (July 2, 1937 – September 26, 1965) was a United States Army officer of Puerto Rican–Italian descent who was posthumously awarded the United States' highest military decoration—the Medal of Honor—for his heroic actions while a prisoner of war (POW) during the Vietnam War. He was the first member of the U.S. Army to be awarded the Medal of Honor for actions performed in Southeast Asia while in captivity.

Early years
Humbert Roque Versace was born in Honolulu, Hawaii, on July 2, 1937.  He was the eldest of five children born to Marie Teresa Ríos (1917–1999)—the author of three books, including the Fifteenth Pelican, on which The Flying Nun (starring Sally Field), the TV series of the 1960s, was based—and Colonel Humbert Joseph Versace (1911–1972).

Versace grew up in Alexandria, Virginia, and attended Gonzaga College High School in Washington, D.C. during his freshman and sophomore years.  His junior year he attended Frankfurt American High School in Germany. He graduated from Norfolk Catholic High School in his senior year.
 He joined the Armed Forces in Norfolk, Virginia. As had his father before him, Versace entered the United States Military Academy West Point. He graduated in 1959 and was commissioned a Second Lieutenant of Armor in the U.S. Army.

He was a member of Ranger Class 4–60 and was awarded the Ranger Tab on December 18, 1959. Upon graduation from Ranger School, Capt. Versace attended Airborne School and was awarded the parachutist badge. He then served with 3rd Battalion, 40th Armor, 1st Cavalry Division in the Republic of Korea as an M-48 tank platoon leader from March 1960 to April 1961. Captain Versace was then assigned to the 3rd U.S. Infantry (Old Guard), where he served as a tank platoon leader in Headquarters and  Headquarters Company. After volunteering for duty in Vietnam, he  attended the Military Assistance Institute, the Intelligence course at Fort Holabird, Maryland, and the USACS Vietnamese language Course at the Presidio of Monterey.

Vietnam War
On May 12, 1962, Versace began his first tour of duty in the Republic of Vietnam as an intelligence advisor. In May 1963, he volunteered for a six-month extension of his tour.  He planned to attend seminary at the conclusion of his service and join the Catholic priesthood, hoping to return to Vietnam as a missionary working with orphans.

Less than two weeks before the end of his tour, on October 29, 1963, while visiting a Military Academy classmate in Detachment A-23, 5th Special Forces Group in the Mekong Delta, Versace accompanied several companies of South Vietnamese Civilian Irregular Defense (CIDG) troops who had attacked to remove a Viet Cong command post located in the U Minh Forest, a VC stronghold. A VC Main Force battalion ambushed and overran Versace's unit, wounding him in the process.  He was able to provide enough covering fire so that the CIDG forces could withdraw from the killing zone.

A second government force of about 200 men operating only a few thousand yards from the main fight learned of the disaster too late to help.  U.S. authorities said the communist radio jammers had knocked out both the main channel and the alternate channel on all local military radios. Versace was captured and taken to a prison deep in the jungle along with two other Americans, Lieutenant Nick Rowe and Sergeant Dan Pitzer. He tried to escape four times, but failed in his attempts.  Versace insulted the Viet Cong during the indoctrination sessions and cited the Geneva Convention treaty time after time. The Viet Cong separated Versace from the other prisoners. The last time the prisoners heard his voice, he was loudly singing "God Bless America".  On September 26, 1965, North Vietnam's "Liberation Radio" announced the execution of Captain Humbert Roque Versace. Versace's remains have never been recovered. His headstone at Arlington National Cemetery stands above an empty grave and can be located in the Memorial section MG-108.

Upon learning of their son's fate, Marie Teresa Rios Versace and her husband, Colonel Versace, tried to find out what they could about the circumstances. She went to Paris in the late 1960s, trying unsuccessfully to see the North Vietnamese delegation as it arrived for peace talks. Rios Versace expressed her frustration and anguish in poems.

Nominations to award Versace the Medal of Honor were initiated in 1969, but the nomination failed and he was posthumously awarded the Silver Star instead. The quest for a Medal of Honor for Versace languished until the "Friends of Rocky Versace" reinitiated the crusade once more in 1999. Language added by Congress in the 2002 Defense Authorization Act ended the standoff and authorized the award of the nation's highest military decoration for combat valor to Versace.

On July 8, 2002, in a ceremony in the White House East Room, Versace was posthumously awarded the Medal of Honor by President George W. Bush for his heroism, the first time an Army POW had been awarded the nation's highest honor for actions in captivity. Present were his surviving siblings, Dr. Stephen Versace, Richard (former coach of the Indiana Pacers), Michael and Trilby Versace. On November 7, 2008, the Department of the Army announced the revocation of Versace's Silver Star because it was upgraded to the Medal of Honor:

IV—SILVER STAR-REVOKE. So much of Department of the Army General Orders, No. 31, Headquarters, Department of the Army, Washington, D.C., dated 1 July 1971, pertaining to the award of the Silver Star to Captain Humbert R. Versace, United States Army, is herein revoked; as announced in United States Human Resources Command, Permanent Orders 312-07, dated 7 November 2008.

Medal of Honor citation

Awards and decorations
Among Capt. Humbert Roque Versace's military decorations are the following:

  Medal of Honor
  Purple Heart
  POW Medal
  National Defense Service Medal
  Armed Forces Expeditionary Medal
  Vietnam Service Medal
  Vietnam Campaign Medal
Badges:
  Combat Infantryman Badge
  Parachutist badge
Tabs:
  Special Forces Tab
  Ranger Tab
 United States Army Special Forces Combat Service Identification Badge

In memory

The name Humbert R Versace is inscribed on the Vietnam Veterans Memorial ("The Wall") on Panel 01E, Row 033. On July 6, 2002, Rocky Versace Plaza in Alexandria, Virginia, was dedicated in honor of Humbert R. Versace.  There is a statue with the likeness of Versace in the Plaza, which was made possible with a donation of $125,000 raised by the citizens of Alexandria, Virginia. On July 9, 2002, the day after the White House Medal of Honor ceremony, Secretary of the Army Thomas E. White and Army Chief of Staff General Eric K. Shinseki inducted Versace into the Pentagon Hall of Heroes.

In 2003, he was inducted into the Military Intelligence Corps Hall of Fame. The Military Intelligence Hall of Fame is a Hall of Fame established by the Military Intelligence Corps of the United States Army in 1988 to honor soldiers and civilians who have made exceptional contributions to Military Intelligence.  The Hall is administered by the United States Army Intelligence Center at Fort Huachuca, Arizona.

The name of Humbert Roque Versace was engraved in "El Monumento de la Recordación" (Monument of Remembrance), dedicated to Puerto Rico's fallen military members and situated in front of the Capitol Building in San Juan, Puerto Rico, and unveiled by Puerto Rico Senate President Kenneth McClintock (see copy of speech) and PR National Guard Adjutant General Col. David Carrión on  Memorial Day, 2007.

Versace's name and Medal of Honor citation are memorialized in a plaque on the side of MacArthur Barracks at the United States Military Academy in West Point, New York.  Similar plaques around the building honor the Academy graduates who also received the Medal of Honor during the Pacific Ocean theater of World War II.

See also

List of Puerto Ricans
List of Puerto Rican military personnel
Puerto Rican recipients of the Medal of Honor
List of Hispanic Medal of Honor recipients
List of Medal of Honor recipients for the Vietnam War
List of Italian American Medal of Honor recipients

References

Further reading
Puertorriquenos Who Served With Guts, Glory, and Honor. Fighting to Defend a Nation Not Completely Their Own; by : Greg Boudonck; 

This soldier death mentioned in this pdf, goes deep into strategy of communist tactics.

https://vva.vietnam.ttu.edu/images.php?img=/images/231/2310402003a.pdf

External links

1937 births
1965 deaths
People from Honolulu
Military personnel from Hawaii
United States Army Medal of Honor recipients
American people of Italian descent
American people of Puerto Rican descent
Recipients of the Silver Star
United States Army officers
American military personnel killed in the Vietnam War
Puerto Rican recipients of the Medal of Honor
Puerto Rican military officers
Puerto Rican Army personnel
Vietnam War prisoners of war
United States Military Academy alumni
Gonzaga College High School alumni
Vietnam War recipients of the Medal of Honor
Catholics from Hawaii
Burials at Arlington National Cemetery
United States Army personnel of the Vietnam War